Razor Creative is a boutique design, branding, advertising, and marketing firm located in Moncton, New Brunswick. The company was founded as Razor Communications Inc. in December 2003 by Stephen Brander and Rich Gould.  In 2005 the company changed its operating name to Razor Creative.

In 2008 the company was awarded a Canadian trademark for their slogan: Cut through.

In February 2017, Razor Creative was acquired by BrainWorks marketing.

Past and Current Clients

The following is an incomplete list of notable clients.

National or International

Apex Industries
Fatkat Animation
Ganong Bros.
Hill & Knowlton
Kruger
McCain Foods
Primus
PropertyGuys.com
TrustMe Security
Whitehill Technologies

Regional

Commissioner for Official Languages, Province of New Brunswick 
Credit Union Place
The City of Moncton
New Brunswick Youth Orchestra
Pump House Brewery
Saint John Sea Dogs

Accolades

Razor Creative's work for McCain Foods Roasters was featured in the November 2004 issue of Strategy Magazine.

The company's 2Tongues.ca work for the Commissioner for Official Languages, Province of New Brunswick won an Ice Award.

Several of Rich Gould's logos have been published in the book American Corporate ID by David E. Carter.

References

External links 
 Official Web Site
 Official Blog

Advertising agencies of Canada
Marketing companies established in 2003
2003 establishments in New Brunswick
Companies based in Moncton